Focal segmental glomerulosclerosis (FSGS) is a histopathologic finding of scarring (sclerosis) of glomeruli and damage to renal podocytes. This process damages the filtration function of the kidney, resulting in protein loss in the urine. FSGS is a leading cause of excess protein loss—nephrotic syndrome—in children and adults. Signs and symptoms include proteinuria, water retention, and edema.  Kidney failure is a common long-term complication of disease. FSGS can be classified as primary versus secondary depending on whether a particular toxic or pathologic stressor can be identified as the cause. Diagnosis is established by renal biopsy, and treatment consists of glucocorticoids and other immune-modulatory drugs. Response to therapy is variable, with a significant portion of patients progressing to end-stage kidney failure. FSGS is estimated to occur in 2-3 persons per million, with males and African peoples at higher risk .

Signs and symptoms 
The most common symptoms are a result of abnormal loss of protein from the glomerulus of the kidney, and include:
 Frothy urine (due to excess protein)
 Excess water retention (pitting edema, due to loss of serum albumin)
 Susceptibility to infection (due to loss of serum antibodies)

Common signs are also due to loss of blood proteins by the glomerulus of the kidney, including:
 Protein in the urine (often in the nephrotic syndrome-range of >3.5 g/day)
 Low serum albumin (<3.5 g/dl)
 Low serum antibodies
 High serum cholesterol (compensatory by the liver to compensate for low serum oncotic pressure)
 Fatty casts in the urine (secondary to hypercholesterolemia)

Pathophysiology 

FSGS is primarily a disease of the renal glomerulus, the site of filtration of ions and solutes. Podocytes are specialized cells lining the Bowman's capsule that contribute to the filtration barrier, preventing molecules larger than 5 nm from being filtered. FSGS involves damage to the renal podocytes such that larger molecules, most notably proteins, are filtered and lost through the kidney. Thus, many of the signs and symptoms of FSGS are related to protein loss.

On histology, FSGS manifests as damage (sclerosis) to segments of glomeruli; moreover, only a portion of glomeruli are affected. The focal and segmental nature of disease seen on histology help to distinguish FSGS from other types of glomerular sclerosis.

FSGS can be classified by the putative cause of damage to podocytes. Primary FSGS involves cases in which no cause is readily identifiable. It is presumed that a set of unidentified circulating factors in the blood contribute to podocyte damage in these cases.

Secondary FSGS is caused by an identifiable stress or toxin that injures podocytes. Many causes of secondary FSGS contribute to podocyte injury through hyperfiltration, which is a scenario of excess filtration by renal glomeruli. Hyperfiltration can be caused by obesity, diabetes or loss of the contralateral kidney, among other causes.

Secondary FSGS can also be caused by toxins, including steroids and heroin.

A number of genes have been implicated in FSGS. These include: NPHS1, which encodes the protein nephrin that contributes to the filtration barrier; NPHS2, which encodes the protein podocin found in podocytes; and INF2, which encodes the actin-binding protein formin.

The pathogenesis of HIV-associated FSGS is unclear, but may be primarily due to the presence of the G1/G2 risk alleles for APOL1. There is some data to suggest that HIV can infect tubular epithelial cells and podocytes, but much remains to be known.

Diagnosis
Diagnosis of FSGS is made by renal biopsy that includes at least 15 serial cuts with at least 8 glomeruli. Histologic features include sclerosis (scarring) of a portion (average: 15%) of the glomerular space, with only a portion of glomeruli manifesting any sclerosis.

Other tests helpful in the diagnosis include urine protein, urinalysis, serum albumin, and serum lipids. A clinical picture of proteinuria, low blood protein levels (albumin, antibodies), and high blood cholesterol would support a diagnosis of FSGS, although these do not help to distinguish between FSGS and other causes of proteinuria.

Classification

Five mutually exclusive variants of focal segmental glomerulosclerosis may be distinguished by the pathologic findings seen on renal biopsy:
 Collapsing variant
 Glomerular tip lesion variant
 Cellular variant
 Perihilar variant
 Not otherwise specified (NOS) variant.

Recognition of these variants may have prognostic value in individuals with primary focal segmental glomerulosclerosis. The collapsing variant is associated with higher rate of progression to end-stage renal disease, whereas the glomerular tip lesion variant has a low rate of progression to end-stage renal disease in most patients. The cellular variant shows similar clinical presentation to collapsing and glomerular tip variant but has intermediate outcomes between the other two variants.

Treatment 
First-line treatment for primary FSGS consists of anti-inflammatory drugs. Specifically, glucocorticoids are begun in patients manifesting with nephrotic-range proteinuria (>3.5 g/day). For patients who maintain nephrotic-range proteinuria despite glucocorticoids, or for patients who demonstrate glucocorticoid intolerance, calcineurin inhibitors (e.g., tacrolimus) are initiated. Successful treatment is defined as a drop in proteinuria to sub-nephrotic ranges.

The treatment of secondary FSGS involves addressing the particular toxic or stress agent.

Prognosis 
The majority of untreated cases of FSGS will progress to end-stage kidney disease. Important prognostic factors include the degree of proteinuria and initial response to therapy.

Patients with nephrotic-range (>3.5 g/day) proteinuria have over a 50% rate of progression to end-stage kidney disease at 10 years. Only 15% of patients with sub-nephrotic ranges of proteinuria progress to end-stage renal failure at 10 years.

Initial response to therapy also dictates long-term outcomes. Those defined as having a "complete response" typically manifest a proteinuria of <300 mg/day; those with a "partial response" manifest a sub-nephrotic range of proteinuria, <3.5 g/day. Either complete or partial response is associated with 80% kidney survival at 10-years, compared with about 50% among non-responsive patients.

Epidemiology 
FSGS accounts for 35% of all cases of nephrotic syndrome, making it one of the most common causes of nephrotic syndrome in the United States. FSGS accounts for 2% of all cases of kidney failure. African American patients have 4 times the likelihood of developing FSGS. Men are about 2 times as likely to develop FSGS as compared with women.

See also
 Glomerulonephritis
 Nephrotic syndrome

References

External links 

Kidney diseases
Channelopathies
Disorders causing edema